Doctor Who is a British science fiction television programme produced by the BBC. The show has been a large influence in the media since its inception in 1963. Along with the regular series, special Christmas episodes were initially broadcast every year, beginning with "The Christmas Invasion" (2005) and ending with "Twice Upon a Time" (2017). Beginning with the Thirteenth Doctor, the traditional Christmas special episode was moved to the following New Year's Day timeslot, with episodes being produced for the holiday, beginning with "Resolution" (2019) and the most recent special being "Eve of the Daleks" (2022).

Episodes

Classic era
During the first run of the programme (1963–1989), special episodes were not a frequent occurrence. During the third season, the twelve-part serial The Daleks' Master Plan was broadcast weekly over the 1965–1966 Christmas period, with its seventh and eighth episodes scheduled for Christmas and New Year's Day respectively. The former, "The Feast of Steven", was scripted as a comic interlude in the style of a pantomime, in the middle of an otherwise epic adventure. In its final scene, as the Doctor and his companions celebrate Christmas with a toast, the First Doctor (William Hartnell) turns to the camera and breaks the fourth wall by saying "Incidentally, a happy Christmas to all of you at home." The following episode, "Volcano", returns to the main narrative of The Daleks' Master Plan, although its ending briefly features a contemporary New Year's Eve. No subsequent episodes of the series' original run were broadcast on Christmas Day; the first episodes of Day of the Daleks (1972) and The Face of Evil (1977) were first shown on New Year's Day, but make no reference to the holiday season.

Revived era

Home media release

The Christmas specials between "The Christmas Invasion" and "Last Christmas", inclusive, were released as a DVD and Blu-ray boxset titled Doctor Who – The 10 Christmas Specials on 19 October 2015.

References

Doctor Who
 
Christmas
Lists of British drama television series episodes
Lists of British science fiction television series episodes
Lists of television specials
New Year's television specials
Science fiction television specials